George Albert Rowles (16 December 1865 – 12 September 1922) was a Welsh rugby union international halfback who played club rugby for Penarth RFC|Penarth and Cardiff . He won a single cap for Wales national rugby union team|Wales during the 1892 Home Nations Championship. He was the second player to represent Wales while playing club rugby for Penarth, after Dickie Garrett.

Rugby career 
Rowles had played for Penarth for several years before his international selection in 1892, he was senior team captain during the 1885/86 season, and is recorded as being a member of the Penarth team that won the Cardiff District Cup in 1888. Rowles won his only Welsh cap when he was chosen to partner Newport's Percy Phillips in the opening game of the 1892 Home Nations Championship against England. The preferred halfback partnership for Wales were the Swansea pairing of Evan and David James, but with the James brothers unavailable, Rowles was given his opportunity. Under the captaincy of Arthur 'Monkey' Gould, Wales were outclassed by England who won by three goals and a try to nil. The next match the James brother were brought back in and Rowles and Phillips lost their places; though Phillips would represent his country on a further five occasions, Rowles never played for Wales again.

International matches played
Wales
 1892

Bibliography

References 

1866 births
1922 deaths
Gloucestershire County RFU players
Penarth RFC players
Rugby union players from Pontypool
Rugby union scrum-halves
Wales international rugby union players
Welsh rugby union players